Martha Johnson may refer to:

Martha Johnson (singer) (born 1950), Canadian pop singer and songwriter
Martha Ann Johnson (born 1955), serial killer
Martha N. Johnson (born 1952), former administrator of the United States General Services Administration
Martha Johnson Patterson (1828–1901), daughter of U.S. president Andrew Johnson

See also
Johnson (surname)